Euxoa cinereopallidus is a moth of the family Noctuidae. It is found in British Columbia, Alberta and Saskatchewan in Canada. It is also found in the United States, including Utah and Texas.

The wingspan is about 32 mm.

References 

Euxoa
Moths of North America
Moths described in 1903